Lab-e Darya-ye Lasku Kalayeh (also Romanized as Lab-e Daryā-ye Laskū Kalayeh; also known as Laskooh, Laskū Kalāyeh, Laskū Kalāyeh-ye Lab-e Daryā, Leskū Kalāyeh, Lesku Kelāyeh, and Leskū Kelāyeh-e Lab-e Daryā) is a village in Kiashahr Rural District, Kiashahr District, Astaneh-ye Ashrafiyeh County, Gilan Province, Iran. At the 2006 census, its population was 791, in 247 families.

References 

Populated places in Astaneh-ye Ashrafiyeh County